Juan Latino (born Juan de Sessa; Ethiopia c. 1518 – Granada, c. 1594/1597) was a Spanish professor of Ethiopian descent at the University of Granada during the sixteenth century. He could be considered the first African who studied at a European university and who reached a professorship on Grammar and Latin Language at the University of Granada.

Life
Juan Latino was born in 1518 as Juan de Sessa to a black slave from Ethiopia, since 1520 slave of Luis Fernández de Córdoba (c. 1480–1526), the second Duke consort of Sessa.

He went to Granada where he was educated together with his owner's son Gonzalo II Fernández de Córdoba (1520-1578), third of the same title, and with the grandson of Gonzalo Fernández de Córdoba, another famous Gonzalo, who was called "Gran Capitán".

His literary and fiercest personal enemy León Roque de Santiago mentioned that Latino was born in Baena, as the son of a black slave woman and his master, the Duke of Sessa, Luis Fernández de Córdoba, who was also the father of his childhood friend and protector Gonzalo II Fernández de Córdoba.

Latino excelled in classical languages and music, and studied with the famous grammarian Pedro de Mota. The Duke himself commented on his dexterity, calling him: "rara avis in terra corbo simillima nigro" (in English: "a rare bird, black like a crow").

The University of Granada was opened in 1526, five months after the coming of Emperor Dawit II to the city. After the papal bull, it began to confer degrees in 1533 and was set free on 1538.

In 1545, in the presence of the Archbishop, the listener of the Real Chancery, Conde de Tendilla, and many other gentlemen, Latino, aged 28 years old, received the degree of Bachelor.

One of the houses he frequently visited to teach his varied grammatical teachings was the property of the Duke's administrator Licenciado Carleval, where his young daughter, Ana de Carleval, received classes from Latino. Ana de Carleval was famous in the city for her extraordinary beauty and her fiancée (by her father) to Don Fernando de Valor (future Abén Humeya). He and the young white lady started a relationship and a marriage took place between 1547 and 1548. They had  4 children. The playwright Diego Jiménez de Enciso (1585–1633) composed a comedy about him and his love-affair with his student and future white wife, named Juan Latino.

On 31 December 1556, in Granada, Latino received the Chair of grammar and Latin language of the cathedral which he held for 20 years.

Latino retired in 1586 and died between 1594 and 1597. He was buried in the church of Santa Ana de Granada, whose archive from that time has since been burned.

Works

Latino published three volumes of poems between 1573 and 1585.

His poem Austrias Carmen, was dedicated to John of Austria after his victory over the Morisco insurrection in Granada, known as the War of the Alpujarras (1568–1572).

He has been hailed as one of the first writers to have used signifyin(g).

Notes

References
Black Africans in Renaissance Europe ed. Thomas F. Earle and Kate J. P. Lowe 
Measuring the moment: strategies of protest in eighteenth-century Afro-English Writing by Keith A. Sandiford 
 O. R. Dathorne. The Black mind: a history of African literature. Minneapolis: University of Minnesota Press 1974.
 Aurelia Martín Casares. Juan Latino: talento y destino. Granada: Universidad de Granada, 2016.
 Elizabeth R. Wright. The Epic of Juan Latino: Dilemmas of Race and Religion in Renaissance Spain. Toronto: University of Toronto Press, 2016.
 Olivette Otele, African Europeans: An untold history. London: Hurst, 2020, esp. p. 39-66.

External links 

 Juan Latino, "On the Birth of Untroubled Times" (De natali serenissimi) (1572), selections in English and Spanish (pedagogical edition) with introduction, notes, and bibliography in Open Iberia/América (open access teaching anthology)

Academic staff of the University of Granada
1518 births
1596 deaths
Spanish slaves
University of Granada alumni
16th-century Latin-language writers
Latin-language education
16th-century slaves